Hat Creek (Achumawi: Hatiwïwi) is a  stream and tributary of the Pit River, which is located in Shasta County of northern California.

The creek rises in two forks on the eastern slopes of Lassen Peak in Lassen Volcanic National Park, and flows northward through Lassen National Forest to its mouth at Lake Britton near Burney, California.

Hat Creek is so named because a surveyor lost his hat there.

Wild Trout Waterway
The lower three and a half miles of the creek has been designated by the California Department of Fish and Game as a "Wild Trout Waterway," with restrictive catch limits. This area has a similar geology to the chalk streams of southern England, and is considered a classic trout stream.

Towns
The main towns along Hat Creek are Hat Creek and Old Station, which is closer to Lassen Park.  The Hat Creek Radio Observatory is located near the town of Hat Creek.

During the May 19, 1915, eruption of Mount Lassen, a lahar or mudflow swept down Hat Creek and neighboring Lost Creek.

See also

List of rivers of California

There is a small mountain in Lassen National Park where the stream starts. It is square topped and looks like a hat, therein lies the derivation of the name!

References

 Wild trout & catch-and-release waters; "Hat Creek"; California Department of Fish and Game; 2003; url accessed October 26, 2006
 Hat Creek Fly Fishing; Troutsource.com; url accessed October 26, 2006

Rivers of Shasta County, California
Pit River
Tributaries of the Sacramento River
Lassen National Forest
Lassen Volcanic National Park
Gliding in the United States
Hang gliding sites
Rivers of Northern California